Osama Yousef Al-Khalaf (born December 26, 1996) is a Saudi professional footballer who plays as a midfielder or a right back for Pro League side Al-Fayha.

Honours
Al-Nassr
 Saudi Super Cup: 2020

References

External links 
 

1996 births
Living people
Saudi Arabian footballers
Saudi Arabia youth international footballers
Saudi Arabia international footballers
People from Al-Hasa
Hajer FC players
Ettifaq FC players
Al-Hazem F.C. players
Al Nassr FC players
Al-Tai FC players
Al-Fayha FC players
Association football fullbacks
Association football midfielders
Saudi Professional League players
Saudi First Division League players
Saudi Arabian Shia Muslims